Lucía Martínez Colón (born 10 October 1961) is a Puerto Rican windsurfer. She competed in the 1992 Summer Olympics and the 1996 Summer Olympics.

References

1961 births
Living people
Olympic sailors of Puerto Rico
Sailors at the 1992 Summer Olympics – Lechner A-390
Sailors at the 1996 Summer Olympics – Mistral One Design
Place of birth missing (living people)
Puerto Rican female sailors (sport)
Puerto Rican windsurfers
Female windsurfers